Sriboonruang Wittayakarn School  (commonly called: Sibunrueang;) is a large high school in Nong Bua Lamphu. The school is located in Mu 13, Ban Santisuk, Muang Mai, Sriboonrueng District, Nongbua Lamphu province. It is in the BuaBan campus and under the Office of the Secondary Educational Service Area Office 19.

History 
Before 1974, most of the graduates of Sriboonrueng Nongbua Lamphu province No education opportunities One of the reasons is that the secondary school is located far away. It was not easy to travel until 2512 is planned to establish a secondary school in Si Bun Rueang. However, this project must be stopped for a period until 1973, the district has brought various information to the Department of Education. And the Ministry of Education was established on May 23, 1974 to be named Sriboonruang Wittayakarn School under the Department of General Education. Ministry of Education Sriboonrueng School The first student was opened on May 17, 1974. In the first year, two classes were offered. There were 161 students enrolled. The school received only 90 students, and the number of classrooms and students increased every year to the present.
It is currently the secondary school of Sriboonrueng and is a large international standard school.

Course

Junior high school level

High school level

Director names

O-NET average  
This is O-NET average of Sriboonruang Wittayakarn School in 5 Basic Subject. They are Math, Science, Social study, English and Thai language

References

External links 
 
 Another website for the school from The Secondary Education Area office 19
 School buildings

Secondary schools in Thailand
Schools in Nong Bua Lamphu Province